Willem Verschuring (September 25, 1660, Gorinchem – March 11, 1726, Gorinchem), was a Dutch Golden Age painter.

Biography
He learned to paint from his father, Hendrik Verschuring, and later became a pupil of Jan Verkolje in Delft. He specialized in making portraits and merry companies and could have become a great painter, but he left painting for more lucrative pursuits.

According to the RKD he followed in the footsteps of his father and became a member of the Gorinchem regency (Vroedschap) in 1702.

References 

Dutch Golden Age painters
Dutch male painters
1660 births
1726 deaths
People from Gorinchem